Todd Ford (born May 1, 1984) is a Canadian professional ice hockey goaltender who is currently playing for the Heilbronner Falken of Germany's 2nd Eishockey Bundesliga. He was selected by the Toronto Maple Leafs in the 3rd round (74th overall) of the 2002 NHL Entry Draft.

Playing career 
During the 2010–11 season, Ford was signed to a one-year contract for the remainder of the season with the Washington Capitals on February 25, 2011.

Awards and honours
ECHL Goaltender of the Year (2009–10)
ECHL First All-Star Team (2009–10)

References

External links

1984 births
Living people
Columbia Inferno players
Hershey Bears players
Pensacola Ice Pilots players
Portland Pirates players
Prince George Cougars players
South Carolina Stingrays players
Ice hockey people from Calgary
Swift Current Broncos players
Texas Stars players
Toronto Maple Leafs draft picks
Toronto Marlies players
Vancouver Giants players
Victoria Salmon Kings players
Canadian ice hockey goaltenders